dprobes (Dynamic Probes) is a Linux kernel analysis framework created in 2004, which features the ability to insert software probes dynamically into running code. It is based on kprobes.

History
First versions was released at June, 2004.

dprobes was first introduced in SUSE Linux Enterprise Server (SLES), but since 2006 commercial Linux distributions have headed towards SystemTap as the chosen analysis mechanism.

See also

DTrace
LTTng

External links
 

Debuggers
Linux kernel